Joel Hinman (January 27, 1802February 21, 1870) was born to Colonel Joel Hinman in Southbury, New Haven County, Connecticut, United States. He was the grandson of Benjamin Hinman.

Connecticut Supreme Court
After serving as a Connecticut State Senator from 1835 to 1836, he served on the Connecticut Supreme Court from 1842 and as Chief Justice from 1861 till his death in 1870.

External links
 Chief Justice Joel Hinman
 Shaw v. Shaw ruling against woman's right to divorce

1802 births
1870 deaths
People from Southbury, Connecticut
Chief Justices of the Connecticut Supreme Court
Justices of the Connecticut Supreme Court
19th-century American judges